Giacomo Ferrari may refer to:

 Giacomo Ferrari (politician), Italian engineer and politician
 Giacomo Ferrari (rugby union), Italian rugby union player
 Giacomo Ferrari (sailor), Italian sailor
 Giacomo Gotifredo Ferrari, Italian composer and singing teacher